Argenis (born August 13, 1986) is a Mexican luchador enmascarado, or masked professional wrestler, who is working in the Mexican professional wrestling promotion Asistencia Asesoría y Administración (AAA). His ring name is the Latin word for Silver. Argenis is the son of retired professional wrestler Dr. Karonte and has wrestled as Dr. Karonte Jr. in the past, as well as Hijo del Dr. Karonte (Spanish for "Son of Dr. Karonte"). Argenis' real name is not a matter of public record, as is often the case with masked wrestlers in Mexico where their private lives are kept a secret from the wrestling fans. His patronymic surname is known though, as his father Miguel Urive wrestled as Dr. Karonte, he was unmasked and revealed his full name per Lucha libre traditions. He is the brother of professional wrestlers Místico, Astro Boy, Argos, and Mini Murder Clown.

Professional wrestling career

Early career (2006–2015)
Argenis made his professional wrestling debut in 2006, working as "Dr. Karonte Jr.", named after his father. He would also work as "Hijo del Dr. Karonte", neither gimmick led to much success. By 2007 he began working for Consejo Mundial de Lucha Libre (CMLL) as a Rudo (heel or "bad guy") After he left CMLL he complained to several magazines that he felt that his brother Místico should have asked CMLL to give him more opportunities. After leaving CMLL he began working for International Wrestling Revolution Group (IWRG), but again met only with limited success, even after he became a tecnico (face or "good guy").

Asistencia Asesoría y Administración (2008–present)
In 2008 he was a part of a 30 man group of young wrestlers that got a tryout with Asistencia Asesoría y Administración (AAA) head trainer Gran Apache. Argenis was one of only six wrestlers that made it through the rigorous trial period and won a match against the other five that gave him a job with AAA. The week after his tryout match he made his real AAA debut, working for the first time as Argenis, teaming with Pimpinela Escarlata, Cassandro and Billy Boy against Los Night Queens. Argenis was initially pushed as the "disgruntled brother of Místico". The push was soon halted as Argenis was nowhere near as talented in the ring as Místico and the comparison actually hurt Argenis' chances of the fans getting behind him. By the end of 2008 Argenis rarely worked televised matches, instead working with AAA trainers to improve in the ring. In early 2009 Argenis slowly returned to AAA television, often teaming with Real Fuerza Aérea in trios matches with Real Fuerza Aérea members Laredo Kid, Aero Star and Super Fly, but was not officially a member of the group. By mid-2009, after Real Fuerza Aérea member El Ángel left AAA Argenis was finally made an official member of the group. On September 26, 2009 Argenis made his first appearance at one of AAA*s major shows as he teamed with Real Fuerza Aérea members Atomic Boy and Laredo Kid to defeat Poder del Norte (Rio Bravó, Tigre Cota and Tito Santana) in the opening match of Heroes Inmortales III, in a 'Lucha o Oscuras or "Glow in the dark" Six-man tag team match that took place under a Blacklight with the wrestlers wearing fluorescent outfits. In June 2011, Argenis' brother Astro Boy II joined AAA and Real Fuerza Aérea under the new ring name Argos. On February 10, 2012, Argos turned on Argenis and Real Fuerza Aérea to join rudo group El Consejo. On August 11, 2013, Argenis and fellow AAA worker Drago made their debuts for All Japan Pro Wrestling in Tokyo, defeating Kenso and Sushi in a tag team match. Even before their first match in the promotion, Argenis and Drago were named the number one contenders to the All Asia Tag Team Championship, held by Burning members Atsushi Aoki and Kotaro Suzuki. In the build-up to the August 25 title match, Argenis and Drago began working against the Burning stable, defeating Aoki and Yoshinobu Kanemaru on August 14 and Suzuki and Kanemaru on August 16. On August 25, Argenis and Drago failed in their attempt to capture the All Asia Tag Team Championship from Aoki and Suzuki. On April 18, 2016, Argenis teamed up with Australian Suicide and won a four-way match to become No.1 contenders to the AAA World Tag Team Championship. The two received their shot on April 29, where they were unsuccessful in winning the titles. On March 19, 2017, Argenis won the 2017 Rey de Reyes.

On August 10, Argenis turning Rudo (heel) for the first time in his career betraying his Dinastía and Niño Hamburguesa against El Nuevo Poder del Norte (Mocho Cota Jr., Carta Brava Jr. & Tito Santana). On September 9 at the Puebla show, Argenis starts a feud against Myzteziz Jr. in which he calls him imposter (a reference to his brother by name who was in 2014-15).

Lucha Underground (2015–2017)

Argenis made his television debut on Lucha Underground on the January 14, 2015 broadcast in a 4-way Elimination match against Angélico, Aero Star, and Cage. Cage won the match by eliminating all three men. Two weeks later The Crew (Cortez Castro & Mr. Cisco & Bael) defeated Aero Star, Argenis & Super Fly in  a 6-Person Tag. On January 24, 2015, Pentagon Jr broke Argenis' arm.  After returning from his broken arm Argenis was utilized as a jobber. He did not participate in storylines and made only sporadic appearances.

Starting at the end of Season 1, Argenis' actor also portrayed the character Barrio Negro. Barrio Negro was a member of a trios team called The Disciples of Death, along with his partners Trece and Sinestro de la Muerte. The Disciples of Death defeated Angélico, Son of Havoc and Ivelisse for the Trios Championship. They lost the title in a rematch between the two teams on November 22. On the April 20, 2016 edition of Lucha Underground, the characters of Barrio Negro and Trece were killed off when Sinestro de la Muerte turned on his former partners, and ripped their hearts out. Lucha Underground never acknowledged that Barrio Negro and Argenis were the same person.

Argenis made appearances as Argenis through season 3, still being utilized as a jobber.  He did not appear at all during season 4, and it is unknown if he was still employed by Lucha Underground when it ceased operations in 2018.

Other media
In February 2017, Argenis took part in a skit on Conan, welcoming Conan O'Brien to Mexico.

Championships and accomplishments
Asistencia Asesoría y Administración
Rey de Reyes (2017)
Lucha Underground
Lucha Underground Trios Championship (1 time) – with El Siniestro de la Muerte and TrecePro Wrestling Illustrated''PWI ranked him #296''' of the top 500 singles wrestlers in the PWI 500 in 2015

References

External links
AAA profile
AJPW profile

1986 births
21st-century professional wrestlers
Living people
Masked wrestlers
Mexican male professional wrestlers
Professional wrestlers from Mexico City
Unidentified wrestlers
Lucha Underground Trios Champions